Closter is a borough in Bergen County, in the U.S. state of New Jersey. As of the 2020 United States census, the borough's population was 8,594, an increase of 221 (+2.6%) from the 2010 census count of 8,373, which in turn reflected a decline of 10 (−0.1%) from the 8,383 counted in the 2000 census.

History
The Lenape Native Americans tilled the soil, hunted in the woods, and fished in the rivers and streams before the Dutch arrived in the early 18th Century. The Dutch settlers, though, left an indelible mark on the area. Early records show that after the English takeover of New Netherland, English Governor Philip Carteret in 1669 granted a real estate speculator named Balthaser De Hart a strip of property which extended east and west from the Hudson River to the Tiena Kill, and north and south from today's Cresskill into Palisades, New York. It is within these geographical boundaries that lies what is now known as Closter. The first land grant deed for the area today known as Closter was not written until April 13, 1671.
    
The name Closter is of Dutch origin and first appears in a November 18, 1721 deed between the surviving Tappan Patentees and Peter Haring (who owned land in Harrington Park/Norwood east of Tappan Road and between Harrington and Blanche Avenues)—the meets and bounds of the deed begin “Beginning at the bridge which comes out of the Clooster by the Dwars Kill..." (At that time, Closter was considered part of New York State). In the Dutch language, Klooster or "clooster" means "a quiet place, a monastery or cloister." The name was originally pronounced with an "ow" sound, phonetically, "Klowster." Later, just before the American Revolution, these isolated settlers began to feel the impact of the British Crown in their lives—not only in governmental affairs but also by the influx of English culture on their own language and practices. As a result the "K" in Klooster was dropped and was replaced with a "C" so the now growing village became known as Clooster. By 1795, with the emerging new American culture, the second "o" in Clooster was dropped, and the American English "long o" sound was adopted which led to today's pronunciation of Closter.

The topography gave a sense of isolation and protection, tucked behind the highest point of the Palisades and protected by limited access. Alternatively, sources indicate that the name derives from an early settler named Frederick Closter who is said to have been granted the land in the area in the 1600s.

Reminders of Closter's early Dutch history abound - with local streets named after some of the early families (Bogert, Demarest, Durie, Naugle, Parsells, Vervalen, Auryansen, Haring, and Westervelt), and a rich collection of unique Jersey Dutch houses.

The arrival of the Northern Branch in 1859, followed by additional train service from what became the West Shore Railroad, brought residents to the community who could commute to Manhattan via the ferry across the Hudson River at the railroad's Weehawken depot. Closter's central location earned it the nickname "Hub of the Northern Valley".

Closter was formed as an incorporated municipality by an act of the New Jersey Legislature on January 1, 1904, from portions of Harrington Township. On March 29, 1904, Harrington Park was created from portions of Closter, Harrington Township and Washington Township.

After the turn of the 20th century, Closter changed from being sprawling estates and farms into an upper middle class suburban town.

Geography
According to the United States Census Bureau, the borough had a total area of 3.30 square miles (8.55 km2), including 3.16 square miles (8.18 km2) of land and 0.14 square miles (0.37 km2) of water (4.30%).

Closter has a humid subtropical climate similar to the rest of the Middle Atlantic region of the United States.

Closter borders the Bergen County municipalities of Alpine, Demarest, Emerson, Harrington Park, Haworth and Norwood.

Demographics

2010 census

Korean Americans accounted for 21.2% of the population.

Same-sex couples headed 15 households in 2010, an increase from the 10 counted in 2000.

The Census Bureau's 2006–2010 American Community Survey showed that (in 2010 inflation-adjusted dollars) median household income was $117,147 (with a margin of error of +/− $14,096) and the median family income was $128,656 (+/− $13,704). Males had a median income of $93,578 (+/− $13,709) versus $64,167 (+/− $13,864) for females. The per capita income for the borough was $50,501 (+/− $4,636). About 3.2% of families and 3.0% of the population were below the poverty line, including 1.2% of those under age 18 and 3.4% of those age 65 or over.

2000 census
As of the 2000 United States census there were 8,383 people, 2,789 households, and 2,320 families residing in the borough. The population density was 2,644.3 people per square mile (1,021.0/km2). There were 2,865 housing units at an average density of 903.7 per square mile (349.0/km2). The racial makeup of the borough was 75.32% White, 21.56% Asian, 0.93% African American, 0.10% Native American, 0.81% from other races, and 1.29% from two or more races. Hispanic or Latino of any race were 4.09% of the population.

As of the 2000 Census, 12.75% of Closter's residents identified themselves as being of Korean ancestry, which was the seventh highest in the United States and fifth highest of any municipality in New Jersey, for all places with 1,000 or more residents identifying their ancestry. As of the 2010 Census, 21.2% residents (1,771 people) indicated that they were of Korean ancestry.

There were 2,789 households, out of which 43.3% had children under the age of 18 living with them, 72.9% were married couples living together, 8.0% had a female householder with no husband present, and 16.8% were non-families. 14.0% of all households were made up of individuals, and 7.0% had someone living alone who was 65 years of age or older. The average household size was 2.98 and the average family size was 3.30.

In the borough the population was spread out, with 28.0% under the age of 18, 4.8% from 18 to 24, 28.1% from 25 to 44, 26.0% from 45 to 64, and 13.1% who were 65 years of age or older. The median age was 40 years. For every 100 females, there were 97.1 males. For every 100 females age 18 and over, there were 91.0 males.

The median income for a household in the borough was $83,918, and the median income for a family was $94,543. Males had a median income of $65,848 versus $39,125 for females. The per capita income for the borough was $37,065. About 1.7% of families and 2.7% of the population were below the poverty line, including 3.0% of those under age 18 and 1.8% of those age 65 or over.

Economy 
Closter has an outdoor mall called Closter Plaza that includes stores, restaurants and a movie theater. First constructed in the 1960s, a long-term construction project began in July 2015 that added a Whole Foods, Target, HomeGoods, and other new businesses to the  mall. In August 2012, the mall was used for filming scenes for the film The Wolf of Wall Street. The renovation project was completed in late 2016.

Sports 
The Closter Golf Center includes a two-story driving range and a mini golf course.

Parks and recreation 
Parks in the borough include:
 Amendola Park – located on Willow Road, features a playground
 High Street Park – located at the intersection of High Street and Piermont Road that has a playground and fitness area. 
 Memorial Field – also known as Veterans Memorial Field. Located on Harrington Avenue, it has a playground, athletic fields, and a bandshell. It also has a memorial of all US Veterans as well as a memorial of those who died on September 11, 2001. 
 Mollicone Park – a baseball field located at the intersection of Knickerbocker Road and Eckerson Avenue. This park was honored after Closter-native Vietnam War veteran, Donald Mollicone.
 Ruckman Park – located at the intersection of Piermont and Ruckman roads, that have athletic fields, walking/jogging path, and a playground 
 Schauble Park – located on Bergenline Avenue, this park has a playground, bike path, and athletic fields.

Government

Local government
Closter is governed under the Borough form of New Jersey municipal government, which is used in 218 municipalities (of the 564) statewide, making it the most common form of government in New Jersey. The governing body is comprised of a Mayor and a Borough Council, with all positions elected at-large on a partisan basis as part of the November general election. A Mayor is elected directly by the voters to a four-year term of office. The Borough Council is comprised of six members elected to serve three-year terms on a staggered basis, with two seats coming up for election each year in a three-year cycle. The Borough form of government used by Closter is a "weak mayor / strong council" government in which council members act as the legislative body with the mayor presiding at meetings and voting only in the event of a tie. The mayor can veto ordinances subject to an override by a two-thirds majority vote of the council. The mayor makes committee and liaison assignments for council members, and most appointments are made by the mayor with the advice and consent of the council.

, the Mayor of Closter Borough is Republican John C. Glidden Jr., whose term of office ends December 31, 2026. Members of the Closter Borough Council are Council President Alissa J. Latner (R, 2024), Victoria Roti Amitai (R, 2025), Jannie Chung (D, 2024), Scott M. Devlin (D, 2023), Dolores A. Witko (D, 2023) and Joseph Yammarino (R, 2025).

In January 2015, the Borough Council selected former councilmember Tom Hennessey from a list of three candidates nominated by the Republican municipal committee to fill the vacant seat that had been held by John C. Glidden Jr., expiring in 2016 that became vacant when Glidden took office as mayor.

In 2017, former Borough Council President Robert Di Dio was appointed to the New Jersey State Board of Pharmacy by Governor Chris Christie.

Emergency services 
Closter has its own fire department formed in 1893. The department responds to an average of 269 calls a year.

The Closter Volunteer Ambulance and Rescue Corps was formed in 1936, and serves three jurisdictions: Closter, the neighboring borough of Alpine, and the section of the Palisades Interstate Parkway within Alpine's borders.

Closter also has its own police department. Led by Chief John McTeuige, the department includes a captain, three lieutenants, five sergeants, and ten patrol officers. Two of these officers (one lieutenant and one sergeant) comprise the detective bureau of the department.

Federal, state and county representation
Closter is located in the 5th Congressional District and is part of New Jersey's 39th state legislative district.

Politics
As of March 2011, there were a total of 4,930 registered voters in Closter, of which 1,348 (27.3% vs. 31.7% countywide) were registered as Democrats, 1,060 (21.5% vs. 21.1%) were registered as Republicans and 2,519 (51.1% vs. 47.1%) were registered as Unaffiliated. There were 3 voters registered as Libertarians or Greens. Among the borough's 2010 Census population, 58.9% (vs. 57.1% in Bergen County) were registered to vote, including 80.4% of those ages 18 and over (vs. 73.7% countywide).

In the 2016 presidential election, Democrat Hillary Clinton received 2,309 votes (58.4% vs. 54.2% countywide), ahead of Republican Donald Trump with 1,478 votes (37.4% vs 41.1% countywide) and other candidates with 96 votes (2.4% vs 3.0% countywide), among the 3,952 ballots cast by the borough's 5,557 registered voters, for a turnout of 71.1% (vs. 73% in Bergen County). In the 2012 presidential election, Democrat Barack Obama received 1,857 votes (52.3% vs. 54.8% countywide), ahead of Republican Mitt Romney with 1,639 votes (46.2% vs. 43.5%) and other candidates with 30 votes (0.8% vs. 0.9%), among the 3,550 ballots cast by the borough's 5,136 registered voters, for a turnout of 69.1% (vs. 70.4% in Bergen County). In the 2008 presidential election, Democrat Barack Obama received 2,184 votes (55.2% vs. 53.9% countywide), ahead of Republican John McCain with 1,715 votes (43.4% vs. 44.5%) and other candidates with 28 votes (0.7% vs. 0.8%), among the 3,955 ballots cast by the borough's 5,187 registered voters, for a turnout of 76.2% (vs. 76.8% in Bergen County). In the 2004 presidential election, Democrat John Kerry received 2,100 votes (52.6% vs. 51.7% countywide), ahead of Republican George W. Bush with 1,860 votes (46.5% vs. 47.2%) and other candidates with 27 votes (0.7% vs. 0.7%), among the 3,996 ballots cast by the borough's 5,086 registered voters, for a turnout of 78.6% (vs. 76.9% in the whole county).

In the 2013 gubernatorial election, Republican Chris Christie received 64.2% of the vote (1,183 cast), ahead of Democrat Barbara Buono with 35.0% (646 votes), and other candidates with 0.8% (15 votes), among the 1,883 ballots cast by the borough's 4,945 registered voters (39 ballots were spoiled), for a turnout of 38.1%. In the 2009 gubernatorial election, Democrat Jon Corzine received 1,238 ballots cast (48.7% vs. 48.0% countywide), ahead of Republican Chris Christie with 1,156 votes (45.5% vs. 45.8%), Independent Chris Daggett with 112 votes (4.4% vs. 4.7%) and other candidates with 7 votes (0.3% vs. 0.5%), among the 2,543 ballots cast by the borough's 5,064 registered voters, yielding a 50.2% turnout (vs. 50.0% in the county).

Education
The Closter Public Schools serve students in pre-kindergarten through eighth grade. As of the 2018–19 school year, the district, comprised of two schools, had an enrollment of 1,203 students and 94.5 classroom teachers (on an FTE basis), for a student–teacher ratio of 12.7:1. Schools in the district (with 2018–19 enrollment data from the National Center for Education Statistics) are 
Hillside Elementary School with 682 students in grades Pre-K–4 and 
Tenakill Middle School with 511 students in grades 5–8.Hillside Elementary School has also been awarded the Blue Ribbon School Award of Excellence.

Students in ninth through twelfth grades attend Northern Valley Regional High School at Demarest in Demarest, together with students from Demarest and Haworth. The high school is part of the Northern Valley Regional High School District, which also serves students from Harrington Park, Northvale, Norwood and Old Tappan. During the 1994–1996 school years, Northern Valley Regional High School at Demarest was awarded the Blue Ribbon School Award of Excellence by the United States Department of Education. As of the 2017–18 school year, the high school had an enrollment of 1,018 students and 91.6 classroom teachers (on an FTE basis), for a student–teacher ratio of 11.1:1. Local students had attended Closter High School until Northern Valley Regional High School at Demarest opened in 1955, whereupon the Closter school was closed.

Public school students from the borough, and all of Bergen County, are eligible to attend the secondary education programs offered by the Bergen County Technical Schools, which include the Bergen County Academies in Hackensack, and the Bergen Tech campus in Teterboro or Paramus. The district offers programs on a shared-time or full-time basis, with admission based on a selective application process and tuition covered by the student's home school district.

Houses of worship 
The Church of Saint Mary is a faith community in the Roman Catholic tradition. The parish offers daily and weekend masses. The parish conducts religious education for youth and adult enrichment programs. The Church of Saint Mary features 33 notable stained glass windows, sketched by Sister M. Conegunda of the Felician Sisters and crafted by the Cloister Art Studios.

Temple Emanu-El is a Conservative synagogue that offers weekly services in addition to a Hebrew school for children beginning at age 3.

Transportation

Roads and highways

County Route 501, County Route 502 and County Route 505 travel through Closter.

Closter can also be reached via the Palisades Interstate Parkway and U.S. Route 9W, which pass through adjacent municipalities.

Public transportation
The NJ Transit 167 and 177 bus routes provide service along Schraalenburgh Road to the Port Authority Bus Terminal in Midtown Manhattan.

Coach USA's Red and Tan Lines provides service from Closter to the Port Authority Bus Terminal via the 20 and 14E bus routes. Saddle River Tours / Ameribus offers service on the 20 / 84 route to the George Washington Bridge Bus Station.

Notable people

People who were born in, residents of, or otherwise closely associated with Closter include:

 Coe Finch Austin (1831–1880),  botanist and founding member of the Torrey Botanical Club
 Abram Belskie (1907–1988), British-born sculptor
 Benjamin Blackledge (1743–1815), first English teacher in Closter and "the most prominent man in the northern part of Bergen County"
 George Dayton (1827–1938), represented Bergen County in the New Jersey Senate from 1875 to 1877
 Emme (born 1963), plus-size model
 Bill Evans (1929–1980), jazz pianist and composer who mostly worked in a trio setting
 Brian Gorman (born 1959), umpire in Major League Baseball
 Tom Gorman (1919–1986), Major League Baseball umpire
 Bruce Harper (born 1955), former NFL running back and kick returner who played for the New York Jets
 Israel Horowitz (1916–2008), record producer who became an editor and columnist on classical music at Billboard magazine
 Richard Hunt (1951–1992), puppeteer best known for his association with The Muppets
 Helen Jepson (1904–1997), lyric soprano who was lead soprano at the Metropolitan Opera from 1935 to 1941
 Marcel Jovine (1921–2003), sculptor and creator of The Visible Man, The Visible Woman and The Closter Seal
 Philip Kwon, deputy counsel for the Port Authority of New York and New Jersey
 Tommy La Stella (born 1989), second baseman for the Atlanta Braves and Chicago Cubs
 London Lee (born 1935), comedian billed as "The Rich Kid"
 Robert Lipsyte (born 1938), sports journalist and author
 Sam Lipsyte (born 1968), author
 Rich Luzzi (born 1978), frontman for Rev Theory
 Joseph Muller (1883–1939), collector, sailor and employee of the New York Public Library
 J. Massey Rhind (1860–1936), sculptor
 Mike Stanton (born 1967), former MLB relief pitcher who played for the New York Yankees
 Tom Waddell (born 1958), former Major League Baseball pitcher

Sources 

 Municipal Incorporations of the State of New Jersey (according to Counties) prepared by the Division of Local Government, Department of the Treasury (New Jersey); December 1, 1958.
 Clayton, W. Woodford; and Nelson, William. History of Bergen and Passaic Counties, New Jersey, with Biographical Sketches of Many of its Pioneers and Prominent Men., Philadelphia: Everts and Peck, 1882.
 Garbe-Morillo, Patricia. Closter and Alpine, Arcadia Publishing Images of America series, 2001. .
 Harvey, Cornelius Burnham (ed.), Genealogical History of Hudson and Bergen Counties, New Jersey. New York: New Jersey Genealogical Publishing Co., 1900.
 Van Valen, James M. History of Bergen County, New Jersey. New York: New Jersey Publishing and Engraving Co., 1900.
 Westervelt, Frances A. (Frances Augusta), 1858–1942, History of Bergen County, New Jersey, 1630–1923, Lewis Historical Publishing Company, 1923.

See also
 List of U.S. cities with significant Korean-American populations

References

External links

 
1904 establishments in New Jersey
Borough form of New Jersey government
Boroughs in Bergen County, New Jersey
Populated places established in 1904